Colobothea bitincta is a species of beetle in the family Cerambycidae. It was described by Bates in 1872. It is known from Colombia and Honduras.

References

bitincta
Beetles described in 1872